Lim-1 is a homeobox transcription factor. This transcription factor is found in adults in the cerebellum, kidneys, and cerebrum, but plays a larger role in development of the fetal head and the female reproductive tract during gestation. During development it is found in the anterior visceral endoderm, is in tissues formed by the primitive streak, and is required in both tissues for head formation. Lim1 is a member of the LIM homeobox gene and encodes a 406 amino acid protein.

Effects on formation of the future head 
In mice, Lim-1 acts in the early development of the mesoderm and ectoderm layers of the developing embryo. The factor is induced by the increasing concentrations of Cerberus, DKK1, and Nodal around day 7–9 in the mouse embryo. Lim-1 contributes to the formation of the anterior portion of the developing head containing the forebrain and midbrain. Research studies have shown that knocking out Lim-1 in mice will cause a range of head deformities, including the complete lack of formation of the head.

Effects on formation of the female reproductive tract 
Lim-1 is also essential for the development of the female reproductive tract, as it causes the persistence of the mullerian ducts that will eventually develop into the oviducts, uterus, cervix, and vagina. Without the expression of Lim-1, formation of the epithelial and mesenchymal cells of the reproductive tract will not occur. While the ovaries will develop, female mice will develop without a uterus and oviducts.

Effects on formation of the future kidney 
Although Lim-1 is primarily associated with head development in embryogenesis, the transcription factor also plays a role in forming the urogenital system.  Since Lim-1 is crucial for head development, most Lim-1-deficient embryos die early in gestation.  Thus, to study the role of Lim-1 on the mesonephros, a conditional knockout model was employed in mice whereby Lim-1 was selectively removed from the nephric epithelium just after it began to form.  The Lim-1 conditional knockout mice had renal hypoplasia and hydronephrosis, thus demonstrating that Lim-1 regulates the differentiation of the nephric epithelium.  Since the extension of the nephric duct as well as the outgrowth of the ureteric bud are influenced by Lim-1, defects in this transcription factor are associated with Potter Syndrome, a rare, fatal congenital disorder.  Without the proper induction of ureteric buds and mesonephric ducts by Lim-1 and other transcription factors, nephrogenesis is impaired.  Renal impairment can cause oligohydramnios, a feature which is characteristic of Potter’s syndrome.   Oligohydramnios is brought about when a continual swallowing of amniotic fluid is paired with a lack of urinary excretion, reducing amniotic fluid volume.  Thus, the necessity of proper Lim-1 activity in patterning a functional urogenital system that is conducive to life is exemplified by Potter’s Syndrome.

Ssdp1 Regulation On Lim-1 
Lim-1 is a transcription factor that controls head and limb development. The primitive node will secrete the signaling molecules “Lefty” and “Cerebus” that then induce the expression of Lim-1, which will then induce formation of head structures. In one research article, “headshrinker mutants”, were also defined by the Ssdp1 gene being disrupted, which also seemed to be associated with defects in the head induction process. It turns out that this data showed Ssdp1 causing “defects in prechordal plate development and anterior truncations.” This data also discloses that Ssdp1 is a coactivator that enhances transcriptional activity with Lim-1 as a complex. These phenotypes expressed by Ssdp1 mutants most likely reflect reduced activity of a Lim-1 complex. So, while Lim-1 acts as the transcription factor heavily responsible for head development, there are many other factors that affect expression of the normal head phenotype.

In mice
Lim1 is down regulated after embryonic day 7.5. Then, the Lim1 gene, with help from the anterior definitive mesoderm, goes to regulate sequential signaling from the anterior visceral endoderm. This signal regulation is necessary for head formation. The Lim1 gene is also expressed in adult life, possibly to maintain a differentiated state in neural tissue of adults. During embryogenesis, Lim1 is expressed from the central nervous system (CNS) and the excretory system (primarily the kidney). In the CNS, it is expressed approximately 10 days after fertilization and patterns the forebrain, midbrain, hindbrain, and spinal cord regions. In the spinal cord Lim1 is expressed in dorsal and lateral parts but is not detected in the ventricular region.

Effects on Clear Cell Renal Cell Carcinoma
Although Lim-1 is mainly expressed during gestation, in adult life Lim-1 can be re-expressed in the renal tract only when Clear Cell Renal Cell Carcinoma (CCC) is present in the body. Lim-1 acts as an oncogene in CCC and becomes a growth factor and a survival factor through overexpression. Lim-1 is expressed by the tumors that develop from CCC. Tumor growth is determined by the rate of Lim-1 expression, so as Lim-1 expression increases, CCC tumor size increases, and when Lim-1 expression is silenced, CCC tumor growth declines.  From these findings, scientists have discovered that targeting Lim-1 in CCC could result in an innovative therapeutic intervention, which could lead to a potential  cure for patients with CCC.

References

Mouse genes